The UAAP Ballroom Formation Competition is a contest on dance sport among member-schools of the University Athletic Association of the Philippines. Its first edition was held on 3 September 2016 in UST Quadricentennial Pavilion Arena.

It has two categories: the Latin America division and the Standard division. The competition is only a demonstration sport; thus, it has no bearing in the overall standing.

In its first competition, seven out of all eight UAAP member-schools joined. University of the Philippines Ballroom Formation Team won both categories.

Categories

Latin American division 
This consisted of chacha, rumba, and jive.

Standard division 
This consisted of waltz, tango, and quickstep.

Participants

Results

Latin America division 

|}

Standard division 

|}

References

See also
 UAAP Street Dance Competition
 NCAA Cheerleading Competition
 List of domestic club championship attendance: UAAP Cheerdance Competition in a global context.

Cheerdance
2016 establishments in the Philippines